The legal status of drugs and drug precursors varies substantially from country to country and is still changing in many of them. United Nations classify drugs internationally, it affects all its member states.

Territories

Countries

References

Drug control law
Drug policy by country
Law-related lists
Lists by country